Meat is animal flesh that is eaten as food.

Meat may also refer to:

Places
 Meat Mountain, a mountain in Alaska

People
 Meat Katie, a London-based tech-funk producer and DJ
 Meat Loaf (1947-2022), an American musician and actor
 Shawn Stasiak (born 1970), a former professional wrestler known by the ring name "Meat"

Art, entertainment, and media

Fictional characters
 Meat (Mortal Kombat), a playable character in the Mortal Kombat video game series
 Meat (We Will Rock You), a fictional character from the musical We Will Rock You
 Meat Alexandria, a fictional character from the manga/anime Kinnikuman
 Big Meat, a character in the crime film Waist Deep (2006)

Film and television
 Meat (film), a 2010 Dutch drama-thriller film
 "Meat" (Torchwood), an episode of the television series Torchwood
 Carne, a 1968 Argentine film

Music
 Meat (album), a 2010 album by Hawksley Workman
 Meat (EP), a 2015 EP by Idles
 "M.E.A.T.", a 2014 song by Tomahawk

Sports
 Meat, baseball jargon for a rookie or an easy out; see glossary of baseball

de:Fleisch (Begriffsklärung)